The Buctouche River (colloquially spelt Bouctouche) is a river in eastern New Brunswick, Canada which empties into the Buctouche Bay in the Northumberland Strait in the town of Bouctouche.

The river's name means "Big Little Harbour" in the Mi'kmaq.

River communities
Saint-Joseph-de-Kent
Maria-de-Kent
Roy
Sainte-Marie-de-Kent
Upper Buctouche
Coates Mills
McLean Settlement
Hebert

River crossings
Route 126
Route 515
Route 490
Route 525
Route 11
Route 134

See also
List of rivers of New Brunswick

References

Rivers of New Brunswick
Bouctouche